Disappearances is a 2006 film by director Jay Craven starring Kris Kristofferson.

Plot
Quebec Bill Bonhomme is a hardy schemer and dreamer, who, desperate to raise money to preserve his endangered herd through the rapidly approaching winter, resorts to whiskey-smuggling, a traditional family occupation. Quebec Bill takes his son, Wild Bill, on the journey. Traveling with them are Henry Coville, an inscrutable whiskey smuggler, and Rat Kinneson, Quebec Bill's perpetually disconsolate ex-con hired man. Together, they cross the border into vast reaches of Canadian wilderness for an unforgettable four days "full of terror, full of wonder."

The dialogue from the movie was used in the video game Gun for PlayStation 3.

Cast
Kris Kristofferson as Quebec Bill Bonhomme
Geneviève Bujold as Cordelia
William Sanderson as Rat Kinneson
Charlie McDermott as Wild Bill Bonhomme
Gary Farmer as Henry Coville
Lothaire Bluteau as Carcajou

External links
 
 DVD Talk review

2006 films
2000s adventure drama films
American adventure drama films
Films shot in New Hampshire
2006 drama films
2000s English-language films
2000s American films